Latin American Canadians are Canadians who are descendants of people from countries of Latin America. The majority of Latin American Canadians are multilingual, primarily speaking Spanish, Portuguese, French and English. Most are fluent in one or both of Canada's two official languages, English and French. Spanish and Portuguese are Romance languages and share similarities in morphology and syntax with French.

Latin American Canadians have made distinguished contributions to Canada in all major fields, including politics, the military, music, philosophy, sports, business and economy, and science.

The largest Latin American immigrant groups in Canada are Mexican Canadians, Colombian Canadians, and Salvadoran Canadians.

History
 
The majority of Latin American Canadians are recent immigrants who arrived in the late 20th century from Mexico, Colombia, El Salvador, Puerto Rico, Peru with smaller communities from Chile, Venezuela, Brazil, Cuba, Guatemala, and elsewhere, with nearly all Latin American countries represented. Reasons for immigrating include Canada's better economic opportunities and politics or civil war and political repression in their native countries, as in the case of Cubans fleeing from the Fidel Castro revolution, Chileans escaping from Augusto Pinochet's rule, Salvadorans fleeing from the Salvadoran Civil War, Peruvians escaping from the Internal conflict in Peru, Dominicans opposed to the regimes of Rafael Trujillo and Joaquin Balaguer, Mexicans escaping from the Mexican Drug War, Colombians from the violence in their country and Venezuelans opposed to the rule of the Socialist Unity Party.

Demographics
As of the 2021 Canadian Census, the largest Latin American Canadian communities are in the census metropolitan areas of Toronto (156,455; 2.5%), Montreal (137,850; 3.2%), Vancouver (51,500; 2.0%), Calgary (34,395; 2.3%), Edmonton (21,960; 1.6%), Ottawa (20,620; 1.4%), and Hamilton (14,605; 1.9%). The fastest growing are in the provinces of Alberta, Manitoba, and Nova Scotia.

Latin American population of Canada by census year

Latin American Canadian population in Canada by province or territory according to the Census

Immigration

List of Canadian census subdivisions with Latin American populations higher than the national average
Source: Canada 2016 CensusNational average: 1.3%

Alberta
Brooks
Calgary
Edmonton
Red Deer
Lethbridge

British Columbia
Greater Vancouver A
Burnaby
New Westminster
Vancouver
Port Moody
Coquitlam

Manitoba
Brandon

Ontario
Bradford
Leamington
Toronto
Kitchener
Brampton
London
Milton
Vaughan
Mississauga
Oakville
St. Catharines
Hamilton (city)

Quebec
Brossard
Montreal
Dorval
Longueuil
Laval
Saint-Lambert
L'Ile-Perrot
Châteauguay
Candiac
Dollard-des-Ormeaux
Sherbrooke
Terrebonne

List of notable Latin American Canadians

Music
Eva Avila, pop singer and 2006 Canadian Idol winner
Boogat, rapper
Fito Blanko, tropical/urban singer-songwriter, born in Panama
Patricia Cano, singer
Marco Castillo, singer-songwriter
José Miguel Contreras, rock musician and lead vocalist of By Divine Right
Criollo, hip-hop group
Beto Cuevas, rock musician and former lead vocalist of La Ley
Eliana Cuevas, singer-songwriter
Lhasa de Sela, folk musician
Carlos del Junco, harmonica player, member of the Cuban del Junco family
Quique Escamilla, Mexican-born musician
Carole Facal, rock musician
Alberto Guerrero, music composer and pianist, born in Chile
DJ Kemo, producer and DJ for hip-hop group Rascalz
Tom Landa, Mexican-born folk-rock musician
Oscar Lopez, flamenco musician, born in Chile
Lindi Ortega, singer-songwriter
John Paul Ospina, singer
Lido Pimienta, singer-songwriter
Adonis Puentes, singer-songwriter
Alexis Puentes, musician known by the stage name Alex Cuba
Quilla, singer-songwriter
Jessie Reyez, singer-songwriter
Alejandra Ribera, singer-songwriter
Smiley, rapper

Writers
Rodrigo Bascuñán, author and journalist, born in Chile
Gloria Escomel, writer and journalist born in Uruguay
Gabriela Etcheverry, poet and novelist, born in Chile
José Latour, novelist, born in Cuba.

Entertainment
David Alvarez, actor.
Joana Ceddia, YouTube Personality (of Brazilian descent)
Juan Chioran, stage actor, born in Argentina
Nick Cordero, stage actor, Costa Rican descent
Tasya Teles, actress
Carlos Díaz, television and film actor, born in Chile
Ona Grauer, television and film actress, born in Mexico
Flora Martínez, actress, part-Colombian descent
Emma Rabbe, television and film actress
Klea Scott, television and film actress, born in Panama
Michael Mando, film and television actor (of Mexican descent).
Emilia McCarthy, actress (of Mexican descent).
Nicola Correia-Damude, actress (of Guyanese descent).

Photography
Bruce Chun, cinematographer, born in Mexico
Federico Hidalgo, filmmaker and film professor.

Politics
Pierre Alarie, Ambassador (of Mexican Descent)
Paulina Ayala, former MP for Honoré-Mercier (New Democratic Party), born in Chile
Estefania Cortes-Vargas, Canadian politician, elected in the Alberta general election, 2015 to the Legislative Assembly of Alberta, representing the electoral district of Strathcona-Sherwood Park, born in Colombia
Joseph Facal, former minister in Quebec (Parti Québécois), born in Uruguay
Miguel Figueroa, leader and President of the Communist Party of Canada
Andrés Fontecilla, leader of Québec solidaire, born in Chile
Rosa Galvez, Senator, born in Peru
Rod Loyola, Canadian politician, elected in the Alberta general election, 2015 to the Legislative Assembly of Alberta, representing the electoral district of Edmonton-Ellerslie, born in Chile
Sergio Marchi, former MP (Liberal Party of Canada), born in Argentina
Ricardo Miranda, Canadian politician, elected in the Alberta general election, 2015 to the Legislative Assembly of Alberta, representing the electoral district of Calgary-Cross, born in Nicaragua
Osvaldo Nunez, former MP (Bloc Québécois), born in Chile
Cesar Palacio, first Latino person elected to the Toronto City Council, born in Ecuador
Saul Polo, MNA in Quebec, born in Colombia
Pablo Rodríguez, MP for Honoré-Mercier (Liberal Party of Canada), born in Argentina
Maria M.Torres,  Councillor, Montreal West Montreal, Quebec, Canada, born in Venezuela.

Science and technology
Ivar Mendez, MD surgeon, Professor and Chairman of Surgery at the University of Saskatchewan, born in Bolivia
Manuel Buchwald, geneticist and academic, born in Peru
Rafael Lozano-Hemmer, electronic artist, born in Mexico.

Sport
Eurico Rosa Da Silva, Ice jockey from Brazil
Tony Menezes, Brazilian soccer player
Michel Acosta, professional soccer player, born in Uruguay
Oscar Albuquerque, former professional soccer player, born in Peru
Keven Aleman, professional soccer player, born in Costa Rica
Manny Aparicio, professional soccer player, born in Argentina
Mauro Biello, former professional soccer player, current assistant coach of the Canada men's national soccer team
Marco Bustos, professional soccer player
Sergio Camargo, professional soccer player, born in Colombia
Miguel Cañizalez, professional soccer player, born in El Salvador
Lucas Cavallini, professional soccer player
Carly Colón, professional wrestler, born in Puerto Rico via Canadian mother
Oscar Cordon, professional soccer player
Marco Dominguez, professional soccer player
Chris Duarte, professional basketball player
Leylah Fernandez, professional tennis player
Marcelo Flores, professional soccer player
Andres Fresenga, professional soccer player
Kianz Froese, professional soccer player, born in Cuba
Manny Gomez, professional soccer player, born in Argentina
Vladimir Guerrero Jr., professional baseball player
Cristián Gutiérrez, professional soccer player
Otto Lopez, professional baseball player, born in the Dominican Republic
Juan Cruz Mascia, professional soccer player
Rosa Mendes, WWE Diva and professional wrestler
Juan Mendez, professional basketball player
Ivan Menjivar, mixed martial artist
Arturo Miranda, professional diver, born in Cuba
David Monsalve, professional soccer player
Cristian Nuñez, professional soccer player
Jonathan Osorio, professional soccer player
Damiano Palmegiani, professional baseball player
Carlos Patino, professional soccer player, born in Colombia
Daniel Pinero, professional baseball player
Willi Plett, professional hockey player, NHL
Robyn Regehr, professional hockey player, NHL
Bryce Salvador, professional hockey player, NHL
Davis Sanchez, professional football player, CFL and NFL
Isidro Sánchez Macip, professional soccer player, born in Mexico
O. J. Santiago, professional football player, NFL and CFL
Eduardo Sebrango, former professional soccer player, born in Cuba
Oscar Taveras, late professional baseball player in MLB, born in the Dominican Republic
Abraham Toro, professional baseball player
Raffi Torres, professional hockey player, NHL.

Cultural adjustment
In 2002, 82% of those who reported Latin American origin said they had a strong sense of belonging to Canada. At the same time, 57% said that they had a strong sense of belonging to their ethnic or cultural group.

People with Latin American origins are also active in Canadian society. For example, 66% of Canadians of Latin American origin who were eligible to vote did so in the 2000 federal election.

See also

 Latino
 Latin American diaspora
 Hispanic Americans
 Portuguese Canadians
 Spanish Canadians

References

 

+
 
Ethnic groups in Canada